Urney St Columba’s is a Gaelic Athletic Association club based in the village of Clady in County Tyrone, Northern Ireland.

The Honourable The Irish Society has provided it with a grant.

A club member received an Ulster GAA President's Award for 2020.

Honours
 Tyrone Junior Football Championship (2)
 1990, 2002

References

External links

Gaelic games clubs in County Tyrone
Gaelic football clubs in County Tyrone